Las Vegas Lights FC is an American professional soccer team based in Las Vegas, Nevada, that plays in the USL Championship. The team made its debut in 2018 and plays its home games at Cashman Field.

The team employs neon imagery in its crest and jerseys. It has engaged in unusual promotions to attract fans, including the use of llama mascots and rewarding players with casino chips. The team's main rivals were Reno 1868 FC, a Nevada club who used to play in the USL Championship but folded due to the COVID-19 pandemic in 2020.

History
The first professional soccer team to be based in Las Vegas was the Las Vegas Quicksilvers of the
North American Soccer League, who moved from San Diego after the 1976 season. The team played at Las Vegas Stadium and had an average attendance of 7,092 during the 1977 season, but moved back to San Diego the following year. The Las Vegas Seagulls of the American Soccer League briefly played at Las Vegas Stadium (by then the Las Vegas Silver Bowl) in 1979, but were terminated by the league after their first season due to financial issues. The city also played host to the 1994 FIFA World Cup draw in December 1993 and was considered several times for a Major League Soccer (MLS) franchise, but was passed over by the league.

The city hosted several exhibition matches between club and national soccer teams during the early 2010s, including a 2012 World Football Challenge match between Real Madrid and Santos Laguna that drew a state-record attendance of 29,152 spectators. An MLS expansion bid was explored in 2014, led by Findlay Sports and Entertainment and the Cordish Company, proposing a 24,000-seat stadium at Symphony Park in Downtown Las Vegas. The Las Vegas bid was rejected for further consideration by MLS in February 2015, putting an end to plans for the publicly financed downtown stadium. Despite an attempted revival, the city declined to submit a proposal in time for the league's deadline for expansion bids in February 2017.

In April 2017, Brett Lashbrook submitted a formal proposal to the Las Vegas City Manager to use Cashman Field as the venue of a USL expansion team that would begin play in 2018. The Las Vegas City Council approved the Cashman Field lease in July, and the USL began planning for a formal announcement in mid-August. On August 11, 2017, Las Vegas was formally announced as a USL expansion team that would join the league in 2018. The team unveiled its official name, Las Vegas Lights FC, on August 29 and its official crest in late October.

Inaugural season

Chelís, a former MLS and Liga MX manager, was introduced as the team's head coach in November and promised to build a team that would entertain. The Lights held their first scouting camps in December and signed several Mexican players using connections from Chelís. In the inaugural preseason match, the team lost 2–0 to the Montreal Impact but attracted a sellout crowd of 10,387 people. The signing of Mexican players caused a language barrier that hindered on-field chemistry during its preseason matches against MLS teams, losing all three, but the team's players worked through the language gap. The team signed former MLS teenage prodigy Freddy Adu, who debuted in a preseason match against his first club, D.C. United.

The team played their inaugural regular season match in Fresno, California, on March 17, 2018, winning 3–2 over Fresno FC. In their first home regular season match, played on March 24, the Lights drew 1–1 with in-state rivals Reno 1868 FC in a match attended by 9,019 spectators. In the 2018 U.S. Open Cup, the Lights defeated FC Tucson and advanced to the third round, where they lost to FC Golden State Force. The club went on a long winless streak in August and September that eliminated the Lights from qualifying for the USL Playoffs. Chelis announced his departure from the club on September 18, following poor performances and an eight-match suspension for misconduct involving a spectator. Las Vegas concluded the season with 8 wins, 19 losses, and 7 draws, and manager Isidro Sánchez was fired on October 14. Former U.S. player and Atlanta Silverbacks coach Eric Wynalda was hired as manager and technical director on October 17.

Affiliation with Los Angeles FC

On March 12, 2021, Las Vegas Lights FC announced an affiliation partnership with Los Angeles FC (LAFC) of Major League Soccer. Under the one-year partnership, Las Vegas became the USL affiliate of LAFC and shared technical staff, including new manager Steve Cherundolo, a former U.S. national team player. In 2022, the affiliation was extended for another season.

Stadium

The Lights play their home matches at Cashman Field, a stadium in Downtown Las Vegas that was primarily used for the Las Vegas 51s, a minor league baseball team from 1983 until 2018. It has 9,334 permanent seats and additional standing room capacity.  The configuration of Cashman Field is more suited for soccer than other former baseball parks. With center field at a right angle and all the foul territory behind first and third base at equal distance, the field is in a square shape and seats are close to the field for soccer. Prior to the Lights, the stadium also hosted MLS preseason matches between the LA Galaxy and San Jose Earthquakes in 2016 and 2017. The Lights have a 15-year lease agreement with the city government to use Cashman Field, expiring in 2032.

The Las Vegas 51s (renamed the Las Vegas Aviators) relocated to a new stadium in Summerlin in 2019, leaving the Lights as the sole tenant of Cashman Field. The Lights began renovations to the locker rooms and stadium offices prior to the 2019 season, with further plans to make it a soccer-specific venue. The city government also began exploring options for a larger soccer-specific stadium in downtown Las Vegas to accommodate an MLS expansion team.

Club brand and jerseys

The Lights name was announced on August 29, 2017, after being decided in an online poll ahead of five other finalists, including Las Vegas FC, Las Vegas Silver, Club Vegas, Viva Vegas and Las Vegas Action. The name evokes the Las Vegas Strip and Downtown Las Vegas, where many buildings use neon lights and signage. The neon imagery is also reflected in the club's crest, a rotated version of the Welcome to Fabulous Las Vegas sign bordered by neon tubes. The crest also features text written in neon tubes, as well as a pink star. The team's colors, blue, yellow, and pink, were submitted by fans and are derived from the city's traditional seal.

The club's jerseys are manufactured by BLK and include the logos of sponsors Zappos and Findlay Toyota. The home jersey was designed by Zappos's art director and is primarily black with the team's color in neon trim. The underside has an emoji smiley face covered in confetti, to be used in goal celebrations when pulled up and over players' heads. The away jersey is primarily white, with light blue and yellow accents and was unveiled with players donning a body painted replica.

Sponsorship

Ownership and management

The Lights are owned by Las Vegas Soccer, LLC, founded by Brett Lashbrook, a former consultant to USL and MLS clubs in Florida and the team's current general manager. Lashbrook spent part of his childhood in the Las Vegas area and was part of Orlando City SC during their transition from the USL to MLS and also worked for the Tampa Bay Rowdies. The team's vice president of corporate partnerships is Steve Pastorino, who worked with the Chicago Fire and Oakland Athletics as marketing director.

The team's first head coach and technical director was Chelís, who left the club in September 2018 after earning a losing record and missing 12 matches due to a suspension. His son and assistant coach, Isidro Sánchez, took over for the remainder of the inaugural season until his firing in October 2018. Former U.S. national team player and television commentator Eric Wynalda was subsequently hired and led the Lights to an improved record but short of a playoff spot. On June 17, 2020, Wynalda was fired by the Lights for an undisclosed violation of league rules during the USL's preparations to resume play amid the COVID-19 pandemic. Former MLS coach Frank Yallop was named as interim head coach later that month.

In April 2018, the Lights became the first professional sports team in the United States to be sponsored by a licensed marijuana dispensary. As part of the agreement, the Nuwu dispensary has a sign in Cashman Field advertising its downtown store, located two blocks from the stadium. Two months later, the club announced a partnership with bookmaker William Hill to offer in-game betting via a special mobile app, along with free $5 bets for each home win.

Club culture

The Lights have used unusual promotions and gimmicks to attract fans, including a DJ in the supporters' section and two llama mascots, Dolly and Dotty. The llamas were provided by sponsors Zappos and appear during tailgate parties and pre-game festivities, including the team photos; during one incident, a llama defecated on the field with only two minutes left before kickoff. The team's mascot is "Cash the Soccer Rocker", a dancing caricature of Johnny Cash and Elvis Presley, who rides a Harley Davidson motorcycle around the stadium. The team's players are rewarded with casino chips for regular season home wins with three or more goals, out of a pot of $30,000 supplied by the Plaza Hotel & Casino for the team. Owner Brett Lashbrook stated that he wanted his team to be "a fast, fun soccer party" and encouraged the use of flags and smoke bombs by supporters. The team regularly hosts "cash drop" stunts, in which helicopters or other means are used to drop money onto the field for fans to grab. One instance with a helicopter in September 2019 was investigated by the Federal Aviation Administration for improper altitude control.

Before home matches, the Lights award a "pink scarf" to Las Vegas residents for their contributions to the community at large. The inaugural honoree of the pink scarf was mayor Carolyn Goodman.

The team had a rivalry with Reno 1868 FC, the other USL team in the state of Nevada, called the Silver State Cup. The rivalry was named in an online poll by fans of both teams ahead of their first match in March 2018.

Broadcasting

The Lights broadcast their home matches and some away matches on KVCW, an over-the-air channel serving the Las Vegas market. All matches are streamed online on ESPN+ as part of a league-wide broadcast deal that began in April 2018. Some of the club's matches are also scheduled to be broadcast on ESPNews and ESPN3. The inaugural preseason match in February 2018 had been aired on "KCLV", a city-run government access channel, but a broadcast agreement could not be reached due to the commercial nature of the club. Radio broadcasts for Lights matches are carried on 1460 AM ESPN Deportes in Spanish.

Players and staff

Roster

Staff

Head coaches
 Includes USL Regular Season, USL Playoffs, and U.S. Open Cup. Excludes friendlies.

Record

Year-by-year

References

External links
 

 
USL Championship teams
Sports teams in Las Vegas
2017 establishments in Nevada
Association football clubs established in 2017
Soccer clubs in Nevada